McKay-Dee Hospital is a not-for-profit health system operated by Intermountain Healthcare. It is located in Ogden, Utah, United States. With 310 licensed beds, it is the 3rd largest hospital in the Intermountain system, and the 4th largest Hospital in Utah. Although not directly affiliated with the university, it is located just southwest of the main campus of Weber State University.

McKay-Dee Hospital offers nationally ranked programs including the Heart and Vascular Institute and Newborn ICU. Other programs include the Huntsman-Intermountain Cancer Center, McKay-Dee Spine Institute, Emergency and Trauma Services and the new Stewart Rehab Center. McKay-Dee Hospital serves northern Utah and portions of southeast Idaho and western Wyoming.

History 
The original Thomas D. Dee Memorial Hospital at 24th Street and Harrison Boulevard in Ogden opened on December 29, 1910, and closed on July 12, 1969, with its patients transferring to the new David O. McKay Hospital at 3939 Harrison Boulevard.

The Dee, as it was called for 59 years, began a second life on November 10, 1971, when the new facility bearing the same name opened its doors adjacent to the McKay, as an integral part of the McKay-Dee Hospital Center.

The Thomas D. Dee Memorial Hospital was founded in 1910 by Annie Taylor Dee and her children as a memorial to their husband and father.

Formative years 
The Thomas D. Dee Memorial Hospital Association was incorporated February 3, 1910. Hospitals in the United States and Europe were studied and plans were prepared by Ogden architect L. S. Hodgson. The contract to build the hospital was awarded to C. J. Humphris of Ogden for $46,625. The building's cornerstone was laid in the northwest corner of the building on September 27, 1910 at 12 noon, with community leaders and members of the Dee family attending. The hospital was ready for occupancy on December 29, 1910, and was formally presented to the public in a ceremony on the fourth floor. Fifteen patients were transferred from Ogden General Hospital two days later.

Rates at the hospital were $3 a day for a private room, $2 for a ward, and $25 for 14 days as a maternity patient. The operating room charge was $10. Nurses' work day was 12 hours with 1/2-day off per week when the patient load permitted. The first year's statistics show a total of 895 patients, 481 operations and 5 births.

In 1912, the first doctor began his internship at the hospital, and in 1913 the Dee Hospital School of Nursing graduated its first class. Students were housed in the basement of the hospital and classes were held in the evening after the students had worked full 12-hour shifts. Later, living quarters were moved to several houses near the hospital, and this arrangement continued until August 1917, when a Nurses' Home was completed.

Ogden's first x-ray machine was received as a gift in 1913. Its usefulness was limited to detecting prominent bone fractures and large metallic foreign objects in the body. A hip joint picture required a 10-minute exposure.

Dr. Ezra Rich did the first blood transfusion in Ogden at the Dee on February 9, 1913. It was a direct gravity flow between two brothers, one of whom had been injured in a saw mill accident near Malad, Idaho. Typing and cross-matching of blood was unknown at the time, but the injured patient recovered.

By 1914, it became evident that the Dee family could no longer be expected to maintain the hospital which had accrued a substantial operating deficit since it opened. Appeals for help in keeping the Hospital open were made, but were unfruitful until an appeal was made to a family friend, David O. McKay. McKay arranged an interview with Joseph F. Smith, Anthon H. Lund, Charles W. Penrose, and Charles W. Nibley, who intervened by the LDS Church essentially taking over the finances of the hospital.

Growth
The Hospital then entered on a period of growth. 
 1917 Nursing home and school completed. New x-ray machine purchased.
 1919 Nitrous oxide gas anesthesia first used.
 1919 South wing addition constructed and fully equipped laboratory established.
 1921 Radiology department organized.
 1922 Radium, the first in northern Utah, used in Hospital.
 1925 First full-time radiologist/pathologist joined the staff.
 1927 North wing constructed.
 1928 Physiotherapy added to Hospital services.
 1929 Pharmacy established, staffed by full-time pharmacist.
 1932 First oxygen tent used in Utah and Capitol Street parking lot given by Drs. Ezra and Clark Rich.
 1937 Central Service established, enabling centralized preparation of equipment and supplies. Now used universally by all hospitals, the Dee's Central Service department was the first in Utah.
 1938 Pediatrics division opened to provide special nursing care for children.
 1942 Separate pathology and radiology departments formed.
 1944 First penicillin administered.
 1946 Ogden Surgical Society formed in Nurses' Home auditorium and Blood Bank established to meet increasing demands for whole blood.
 1948 First outpatient clinics started.

By 1949, the Dee Hospital was again struggling for economic survival.

Management changes
LDS Church Presiding Bishop, LeGrand Richards, chairman of the hospital's Board of Trustees, decided a change in management philosophy was indicated. He recruited Kenneth E. Knapp, a United Airlines executive, and enrolled him in hospital administration classes at Northwestern University. After serving preceptorships in hospitals in Chicago, Detroit and Cleveland, Mr. Knapp became administrator of the Dee Hospital in April, 1951.

He found the Dee in precarious financial condition and took firm steps to alleviate the situation, consolidating departments and closing patient units whose census had fallen below an efficient operating level. At the same time, he invited other community services to lease space in the building and this income bolstered the hospital's financial position. Consolidating departments enabled a reduction in employees.

Renovation and new services
By August, just four months after he became administrator, Mr. Knapp began planning a floor- by-floor renovation of the hospital. Ever-tightening building and fire codes forced other, more extensive remodeling. For this, the Hospital borrowed money from the LDS Church. Under Mr. Knapp's administration, ten years of remarkable change and progress followed, including: 
 Psychiatry division established, the first in a Utah general hospital.
 Physical Therapy department started under supervision of a registered therapist.
 Personnel department established.
 Inservice department for continuing education begun.
 Childbirth education classes started. *Emergency Room opened.
 Outpatient department organized.
 A polio ward equipped with an iron lung

By April 1952, the Board of Trustees approved a 10-year, $523,000 modernization program. It was to include a new neuropsychiatric division, an expanded radiology department with new equipment, a new nursery, and additional bathrooms in the maternity division. New pediatric and orthopedic areas were planned, along with an improved central service system, two new surgical suites and a post-operative recovery room. Other new patient services would include an enlarged blood bank, piped oxygen, and an intercom system between patient rooms and nursing stations. Also planned were new administrative offices, new medical staff lounge and library. The elevators would be modernized and the entire hospital redecorated with new lounges and waiting areas. The hospital also set the standards necessary to apply for accreditation by the Joint Commission on Accreditation of Hospitals – the first Utah hospital to do so.

In June 1953, an effort to persuade women with young families to work in the hospital, a day nursery was opened in the Dee Nursing School building, where mothers could leave their children while they worked at the hospital, a fore-runner of the present D Play School.

Technological developments coupled with population growth necessitated eleven major additions to the Hospital during the 1950s. These included wings on the north, south, east and west, two mechanical boiler units, an addition to the nurses' home, a laundry and kitchen, a fifth floor for the radiology department, clinical laboratory and nuclear medicine. An anesthesia department was added in 1953 with the physicians-anesthesiologists working for the hospital; a Volunteer Auxiliary was formed in 1954; radium therapy on a regular basis was begun in 1955; surgery, the delivery room and the top floor of the hospital were air-conditioned and living quarters for residents and their families were completed in the former Nurses' Home.

In 1955, the Dee School of Nursing and Weber College participated in a national study program under Columbia University Teachers' College with six other community colleges and their hospital affiliates. The study underscored nursing's need for more medical and scientific knowledge. The Dee School of Nursing was phased out. Weber College took over the classes and the hospital became the setting for clinical experience. The new program introduced the two-year associate degree concept to the field of nursing education. In its 45 years of existence, the Dee School of Nursing had graduated more than 700 nurses.

New Hospital
As technical knowledge increased and the mechanics of delivering health care became more complex each year, the Board of Trustees began to contemplate if a new hospital was needed. A thorough examination of building was undertaken, with particular attention paid to changing fire and building codes. Also a nationally recognized consultant was asked to review the community's health care needs and make a recommendation. As a result, a recommendation was made to build a new hospital.

A  tract of land was acquired, and in February 1958 an announcement was made that a new $5-million hospital would be built. $1.5-million of the cost was to be raised by the local community, with the rest of the expense to be borne by the LDS Church. Lack of community interest was evident and by August 11, 1958 planning for the new Hospital had been suspended. It wasn't until April, 1962, that a new Presiding Bishop, John H. Vandenberg, announced Keith Wilcox and Associates had been selected to begin architectural work on a new hospital, now estimated to cost $8-million. The community would be asked to raise $1.6 million.

In 1963, the Hospital Development committee suggested that the proposed new hospital be named in honor of LDS Church President David O. McKay, as it was President McKay who brought the Thomas D. Dee Memorial Hospital into the Church Hospital System. In August 1965 final plans for the 380-bed hospital were ready, with require 730 calendar days to be completed. However bidding for the construction project would not be opened until January 26, 1966. On April 20, 1966, the First Presidency authorized construction of the hospital at a cost of $9,971,785, including furnishings. Okland Construction Company of Salt Lake City was low bidder at $8,198,000. A formal ground-breaking ceremony was held on Friday, April 23, 1966, when President McKay threw the switch to detonate dynamite that signaled start of construction.

The fund drive for the new Hospital continued, with famed comedian Jack Benny was brought to Valley Music Hall in Bountiful. Hospital architect Keith Wilcox and builder Jack Okland also announced plans to construct a professional building adjacent to the McKay.

The new Hospital, plagued by construction problems since the groundbreaking, encountered yet another setback in February when the vinyl flooring did not meet specifications. Its opening was postponed until mid-May. In actuality, it was July 9, 1969, before the hospital was ready. One-hundred-fifty-four patients were transferred to the McKay from the Dee on July 12, 1969, in two hours and 40 minutes. The only unit remaining open in the Dee Hospital was the Tuberculosis ward, until those patients were moved to the Weber County Hospital on June 30.

Continued progress
In the meantime, the Dee continued to progress. In 1959, one of the first intensive care units in the region was opened. Remodeling of the Dee continued because of growing patient loads, and the former Nurses' Home was converted to experimental units to test the first Multi-Level Care concept, where patients were placed according to the amount of care their illness demanded.

The Dee family's continued support of the hospital was evidenced again in the spring of 1963 when a new Home Care program was begun, with the Annie T. Dee Foundation underwriting its operation. It was the first hospital-based home health care program in the State and was not duplicated until the late 1970s, when the federal government sponsored a similar program in the rural area around Richfield.

Patient care continued to advance, as a unique "blood assurance" program was begun to ensure a continuing supply of donated blood to the Hospital Blood Bank. A new Social Services department was begun and purchase of equipment costing in excess of $36,000 was authorized for the Cardiopulmonary Laboratory.

Once construction was underway, the original Hospital began to prepare for the advent of Medicare. The Administrator reported a significant drop in admission of patients over age 65, as they waited for the Medicare Act to become official to help them pay for the cost of their medical care. In July, an agreement was finalized with the State of Utah to take over the care of the tubercular patients housed in the State Sanitarium. In August, 1966, 24-hour physician coverage of the Emergency Room began.

An investigation was begun into the future of the original Dee Hospital. By June, 1968, it was decided the Dee could best serve the community by converting its assets into a new hospital plant adjacent to the McKay. This would fulfill the LDS Church commitment to the Dee family, made in 1916, that "there will always be a Dee Hospital in Ogden." Alternative plans for use of the building were suggested and architectural planning for the new Dee began.

1970s
A new operating structure for the LDS Church Hospitals came about in July 1970, with the formation of Health Services Corporation. Contributions began to flow into the very successful Foundation. A special procedures operating room was endowed, along with a new dining room, a helistop on the hospital grounds close to the Emergency Room entrance and a mural for the lobby of the McKay. Six young doctors began three-year family practice residencies on July 1, which ended the well-established internship program begun at the Dee in 1912.

The first open heart surgery performed in the Ogden area was done at the McKay in November 1970. Establishment of the unit and training of 40 perfusionists to operate the heart-lung by-pass pump were approved by the Governing Board after a comprehensive study by a medical staff and administration committee demonstrated a community need for the service. With three qualified thoracic surgeons on the staff, it was no longer necessary for patients to go to Salt Lake City for this life-saving surgery.

The new Dee Hospital was opened in special ceremonies on the afternoon of November 10, 1971—the 127th anniversary of the birth of Thomas D. Dee, in whose memory the original Dee Hospital was founded in 1910.

With the opening of the new Dee, a new principle of patient care was introduced to the community. Called "Multi-Level Care," it was designed to admit the patient to the exact level of care required by the intensity of his illness and to provide him with the exact amount of professional and technological support he needs to overcome that illness.

The first major remodeling project in the McKay early in 1973 on the second floor. It included addition of two more private labor rooms for a total of ten, and all labor rooms were enlarged to accommodate fetal heart monitoring equipment. The capacity of the Intensive Care Nursery was increased to eight isolettes, and a high risk delivery room was created adjacent to the ICN. A recovery area for mothers following delivery was added in the post-partum wing, and a fathers' waiting room was built. Total cost of the remodeling was $250,000.

The LDS Church made headlines in September, 1974, with the announcement that it was giving its $60-million chain of 15 hospitals to the communities they served. A new non-Church, not-for-profit corporation was formed to operate the hospitals. The new entity acquired a name, Intermountain Health Care, and a president and chief executive Officer, Scott S. Parker, early in 1975. The new Board of Trustees included Thomas D. Dee, II, as treasurer. It was mid-1976 before the lengthy legal divestiture proceedings were completed and the corporate offices were moved from the Church office building.

The hospital also opened a Gastroenterology Laboratory, purchased an Ultrasound system, installed a Gamma camera in Nuclear Medicine, added a telemetry monitoring system to the Coronary Care Unit, purchased four more fetal heart rate monitors and eight more vital sign monitors for ICU and the post-operative Recovery Room. The Porter Family Practice Model Unit outgrew its quarters in the Professional building and was relocated in the Rocky Mountain Plaza at 3950 Harrison Blvd.

Three large construction projects were begun in 1975: remodeling of the Emergency Room; construction of the Edith Dee Mack Green Auditorium and multipurpose classroom center; and installation of a waste compactor. In 1976, the Hospital recorded growth in three major areas – Rehabilitation Medicine, Psychiatric services and births. The fourth floor of the Dee Hospital was dedicated to Rehabilitation nursing. A fifth physician joined the group of doctors to provide 24-hour care in the Emergency Room, and remodeling of the area was completed, at a cost of $140,000.

A major structural change was made in 1977 when a connecting corridor was built between the second floors of the McKay and Dee. Its completion gave better access to the mother and infant overflow unit on 2 Dee. A long-awaited total body scanner was installed in September 1977, providing physicians with a sophisticated new diagnostic service.

The Hospital acquired ownership of the McKay Professional building in 1978; and renamed it in honor of Lawrence T. Dee. The conversion of wards into private rooms continued; the net result to be 87 new private rooms for patient comfort and security. The Thomas G. Barker Vascular Laboratory to detect the possibility of stroke was opened.

In January 1979, the orthopedic unit moved into its new home on the sixth floor of the McKay. Subsequently, patients from the third floor of the Dee were relocated on the fourth floor of the McKay and Rehab patients were moved down one floor to 3 Dee. These moves freed the fourth floor of the Dee so that construction could begin on a centralized diagnostic and treatment center for cardiopulmonary illnesses.

In March, 1979, patients and staff participated in breaking ground for the Annex to house Rehabilitation Medicine and storage. Part of the same contract was a new elevator system to connect the two hospital buildings on the "A" level, 3, 4 and 5 floors, as well as an extension of the clinical laboratory and new air exchange system for the operating rooms. July 12, 1979 marked the tenth anniversary of the new David O. McKay Hospital. In that decade, 36,384 babies were born and 177,552 patients were admitted. 1979 also saw the opening of the hospital's first outreach facility.

1980s
In chronological order, major events in 1980 were completion of a remodeling project on Pediatrics to open an intermediate care unit, the dedication of the new Rehabilitation Center, and a change in Hospital administration.

1980 marked the opening of a new rehabilitation center at McKay-Dee. The center included a rehabilitation therapy pool as well as a gym for cardiac rehabilitation patients.

Completion of the Rehabilitation Center freed space on the "A" level of the Dee for construction of an integrated Outpatient Surgery Center. Patients enter the Center through the south door of the Dee Hospital, are registered on "A", and any tests ordered by the physicians are completed in the same area prior to surgery. After a period in the Recovery Room, the patient is returned to one of the 14 adult or 6 pediatric beds in the Surgical Center for an observation and recovery period before returning home the same day, usually within a total span of four to six hours for the entire procedure.

In 1986, the doors opened on the new McKay-Dee outpatient surgical center and professional office building.

In June 1987, the McKay-Dee Institute for Behavioral Health began operations. The facility was designed for privacy and convenience with separate treatment areas for children and adults. It provides inpatient and outpatient treatment for a variety of disorders including depression, anxiety and eating disorders.

McKay-Dee becomes one of the few employers in the state to open an on-site daycare center for the children of employees. The center was located on the main floor of the hospital and children became a familiar sight around the facility. The daycare service continued in 2002 at the new McKay-Dee Hospital campus with care provided at the Child Development Center built near the hospital on campus.

1990s forward
On August 28, 1997, Intermountain Health Care and McKay-Dee announced plans to build a new hospital to replace the aging McKay-Dee. The planning process for the new facility began with petitioning the Ogden City Planning Commission and City Council to approve a zoning change for the property. The request was eventually granted thanks to support from many of the surrounding neighbors. The Texas-based architectural firm of H.K.S. was selected from among 12 bidders to develop plans for the new McKay-Dee Hospital. The firm was ranked first in the country in the previous year for total dollars spent on new health care facilities. The firm also has ties with local design group, Design West.

In January 2000, McKay-Dee Hospital was recognized by HCIA as one of the best hospitals in an eight-state mountain region. The survey of hospitals across the country is conducted annually by HICA Inc., a New York-based national health care research company.

Ground was broken Wednesday, November 8, 2000 for the Child Development Center at the new McKay-Dee Hospital campus. The new center will occupy about 9,000 square feet (plus a playground) northwest of the main facility. It will accommodate 122 students compared to the current 65.

The new McKay-Dee Hospital Center was opened March 20, 2002 with a red ribbon and fireworks. Operations at the 3939 Harrison Boulevard address for the previous McKay-Dee Hospital Center came to an end in the early morning hours of March 25, 2002. Eight ambulances lined up outside the Emergency Department just before 6 a.m., prepared to transport more than 150 patients to the new hospital. The transfer began with the most critical patients first.

Hospital rating data
The HealthGrades website contains the clinical quality data for Intermountain McKay-Dee Hospital, as of 2017. For this rating section three different types of data from HealthGrades are presented: clinical quality ratings for thirty-one inpatient conditions and procedures, thirteen patient safety indicators and the percentage of patients giving the hospital as a 9 or 10 (the two highest possible ratings).

For inpatient conditions and procedures, there are three possible ratings: worse than expected, as expected, better than expected. For this hospital the data for this category is:
Worse than expected - 0
As expected - 23
Better than expected - 8
For patient safety indicators, there are the same three possible ratings. For this hospital safety indicators were rated as:
Worse than expected - 1
As expected - 11
Better than expected - 1
Percentage of patients rating this hospital as a 9 or 10 - 77%
Percentage of patients who on average rank hospitals as a 9 or 10 - 69%

External links

References 

Hospital buildings completed in 1910
Hospitals in Utah
Intermountain Health
Buildings and structures in Ogden, Utah
Hospitals established in 1910
1910 establishments in Utah
Trauma centers